The 1991 European Weightlifting Championships were held in Władysławowo, Poland from May 24 to May 31, 1991. It was the 70th edition of the event. There were a total number of 127 athletes competing, from 21 nations.
The women competition were held in Varna, Bulgaria. It was the 4th event for the women.

Medal summary

Men

Medal table
Ranking by Big (Total result) medals

References
Weightlifting Database

European Weightlifting Championships
European Weightlifting Championships
European Weightlifting Championships
International weightlifting competitions hosted by Poland